Campo San Trovaso is a city square in Venice, Italy.

Buildings around the square
San Trovaso
Palazzo Barbarigo Nani Mocenigo
Squero di San Trovaso

Piazzas and campos in Venice